Metcalfe Street is a downtown arterial road in Ottawa, Ontario, Canada. It is named for Charles Theophilus Metcalfe, a nineteenth-century Governor General of the Province of Canada. It is a north-south route, operating one way northbound, providing a key thoroughfare from Highway 417 (the Queensway). In the late 19th century and the early 20th century, its homes included those of Ottawa mayor Thomas Birkett (306 Metcalfe, Embassy of the Republic of Hungary in Ottawa), Canada's lumber and railroad baron John Rudolphus Booth (252 Metcalfe, Booth House), inventor Thomas Willson a.k.a. Carbide Willson, and Alexander Campbell, law partner of John A. Macdonald (236 Metcalfe).

The southern terminus is at Monkland Avenue in The Glebe neighbourhood. It proceeds north as a minor residential street until the Queensway interchange (exit 119). As it continues north to downtown Ottawa, Metcalfe Street detours to the east of the Canadian Museum of Nature between Argyle Street and McLeod Street, then continuing straight until Wellington Street where the road ends at Parliament Hill.

Major intersections
(from North to South):

Wellington Street
Sparks Street
Albert Street
Slater Street
Laurier Avenue
Somerset Street
Gladstone Avenue
Catherine Street
Highway 417 (Queensway)
Isabella Street
Monkland Avenue

See also
Metcalfe Station (OC Transpo) (at Albert and Slater streets)
Delegation of the European Commission to Canada (150 Metcalfe Street)
High Commission of Barbados, Ottawa (55 Metcalfe Street)

References

Sources 

Ottawa Transportation Master Plan, see map 7 Central Area/Inner City Road Network

Roads in Ottawa